The Donji Brčeli Monastery, also known as Donje Brčele (Доње Брчеле), or simply Brčeli (Брчели), is a Serbian Orthodox monastery including the Church of St. Nicholas, located near the village of Virpazar in the Crmnica region of Montenegro. It was founded by Jelena Balšić (1365–1443), the daughter of Prince Lazar of Serbia. Šćepan Mali, the impostor pretender of the Russian emperor, was buried here.

Geography
The monastery is located in Donji (Lower) Brčeli, in the Upper Crmnica region, in the Brčeli tribal region (one of seven in Crmnica).

History
It was founded by Jelena Balšić (1365–1443), daughter of Prince Lazar of Serbia and wife of Zetan lord Đurađ II. The village of Brčele had earlier been granted by King Stefan Dečanski (r. 1321–31) to the Monastery of St. Nicholas on the Vranjina island.

In 1714, the Ottomans burned down the Bigovo Monastery in the Bay of Kotor, so the hegumen and monks found shelter in the Brčeli Monastery. Šćepan Mali, the impostor pretender of Russian Tsar Peter III, who managed to rule Montenegro from 1767 until his death in 1773, was buried in the monastery. Petar II Petrović-Njegoš sent Bishop Nikifor of Užice to Brčeli upon his arrival at Morača from the Principality of Serbia.

In 1861, the monastery was reconstructed by Prince Nikola I Petrović of Montenegro.

References

Sources

External links

15th-century Serbian Orthodox church buildings
Serbian Orthodox monasteries in Montenegro
Bar, Montenegro
Medieval Montenegro